Firebreather is a heroic fantasy, play-by-mail (PBM) game.

History and development
Firebreather was a computer moderated, fantasy play-by-mail game. It was published by Horizon Games. Its initial two versions were open-ended, while the third version changed to closed-ended. A subsequent fourth version returned to the open-ended format.

Gameplay
Players led six character parties. Character types included druids, dwarves, elves, knights, pilgrims, swordsmen, sorcerers, woodsmen, witches, and wizards.

Reception
Reviewer Trey Stone, in the July–August 1987 issue of Paper Mayhem magazine stated that it "is not the perfect fantasy comp mod adventure game. But it is damn close. And as a game, I cannot recommend it more strongly". Joey Browning reviewed the game in a 1995 issue of Flagship, providing a generally poor review, noting it was a good game for beginners. On a scale of ten, he rated the game a 3 for Anticipation, a 2 for Depth and Interaction, 8 for the Gamemaster, and a 4 for Value.

See also
 List of play-by-mail games

References

Bibliography

 
 
 
 
 
 

Fantasy games
Multiplayer games
Play-by-mail games